Uncharted Seas is a 1921 American silent romance drama film directed by Wesley Ruggles and starring Alice Lake, Carl Gerard, and Rudolph Valentino.

This is now a lost film.

Plot
As described in a film magazine, after her drunken husband Tom Eastman (Gerard) brings home three cabaret women, Lucretia (Lake) can no longer bear the abuse and turns to arctic explorer Frank Underwood (Valentino), who has long loved her and promised to come whenever she needs his help. Urging her husband to become a man and do something worth while, Lucretia goes with him to the North seas in search of a treasure ship. Tom becomes panic stricken and turns back, while she goes on with Frank, who is on the same mission in his own ship. The two fight against temptation and win, and when their ship is destroyed on the ice they set off to civilization with a dog sled. They are saved by a government cruiser.

Cast
 Alice Lake as Lucretia Eastman
 Carl Gerard as Tom Eastman
 Rudolph Valentino as Frank Underwood
 Robert Alden as Fred Turner
 Charles Hill Mailes as Old Jim Eastman (credited as Charles Mailes)
 Rhea Haines as Ruby Lawton

References

External links

 

1921 films
American silent feature films
1921 romantic drama films
American romantic drama films
Films directed by Wesley Ruggles
American black-and-white films
Lost American films
Metro Pictures films
1921 lost films
Lost romantic drama films
1920s American films
Silent romantic drama films
Silent American drama films
1920s English-language films
English-language romantic drama films